Capital is a Ukrainian Russian-language daily business newspaper.

History 

The newspaper launched on 8 April 2013 – after the conclusion of the founder and publisher, «Business press of the country» («BPC Group») license agreement with one of the world's best known and most respected publishers in the business press – The Financial Times Ltd. Under the terms of this agreement, newspaper "Capital" publishes selected materials of «Financial Times».

Editors 

 Oleksandr Berdynskykh (editor-in-chief)
 Aleksey Nepomniaschiy (main editor)

External links 

 Official Site
 "Business press of the country" announced the launch of the newspaper Capital
 Came out Number 001 of the business newspaper Capital

Business newspapers
Newspapers established in 2013
Russian-language newspapers published in Ukraine
Daily newspapers published in Ukraine
Mass media in Kyiv
2013 establishments in Ukraine
Business in Ukraine